At the 2011 Pan Arab Games, the boxing events were held at Aspire Zone in Doha, Qatar from 14–21 December. A total of 10 events were contested.

Medal summary

Men

Medal table

References

External links
Boxing at official website

2011
Pan Arab Games
Events at the 2011 Pan Arab Games